Armin Lemme (28 October 1955 – 1 August 2021) was a track and field athlete from East Germany who competed in the men's discus throw event at the 1980 Summer Olympics. He set his personal best (68.50 metres) in 1982. Lemme was born in Packebusch, Bezirk Magdeburg on 28 October 1955. He died in Berlin on 1 August 2021, at the age of 65.

International competitions

References

Sources
 

1955 births
2021 deaths
People from Altmarkkreis Salzwedel
People from Bezirk Magdeburg
East German male discus throwers
German male discus throwers
Sportspeople from Saxony-Anhalt
Olympic athletes of East Germany
Athletes (track and field) at the 1980 Summer Olympics
Universiade medalists in athletics (track and field)
Universiade gold medalists for East Germany
Medalists at the 1981 Summer Universiade